The Sweet Methodist Episcopal Church, also known as Sweet United Methodist Church, is a historic church at 7200 Sweet-Ola Highway near Sweet, Idaho. The Late Gothic Revival style building was started in 1905 and was added to the National Register in 1997.

It is located across the road from the former Sweet School, about one half mile south of the Sweet townsite. It is a one-and-a-half-story gable-front building with a square belfry which has a hipped roof steeple.

References

Methodist churches in Idaho
Churches on the National Register of Historic Places in Idaho
Gothic Revival church buildings in Idaho
Churches completed in 1905
Gem County, Idaho
National Register of Historic Places in Gem County, Idaho
1905 establishments in Idaho